Nauener Platz is a Berlin U-Bahn station located on the  line. The square that gives it its name is named after the city of Nauen.

It was opened in 1976 by Rümmler. The colors of the station are a reference to the French tricolore as the part of Berlin where the station is, was a part of the French sector.

References 

U9 (Berlin U-Bahn) stations
Buildings and structures in Mitte
Railway stations in Germany opened in 1976